Trichognathella is a monotypic genus of South African tarantulas containing the single species, Trichognathella schoenlandi. It was first described by R. C. Gallon in 2004, and is found in South Africa.

See also
 List of Theraphosidae species

References

Endemic fauna of South Africa
Monotypic Theraphosidae genera
Spiders of South Africa
Theraphosidae